Francis Gillette (December 14, 1807 – September 30, 1879) was a politician from Connecticut, USA. He was the father of actor and playwright William Gillette and politician and editor Edward H. Gillette.

Gillette was born in Old Windsor, Connecticut (today part of the town of Bloomfield), Gillette moved with his parents, Rev. Ashbel and Achsah Francis, to Ashfield, Massachusetts as a child. He graduated from Yale College in 1829 and commenced the study of law, but his health becoming impaired, he instead engaged in agricultural pursuits in Bloomfield.

He was a member of the Connecticut House of Representatives in 1832, 1836 and 1838 and was an unsuccessful candidate for Governor of Connecticut in 1842, losing to Chauncey F. Cleveland, and nine times subsequently.

Gillette served as chairman of the Connecticut Board of Education from 1849 to 1865 and moved to Hartford, Connecticut in 1852 and later developed the neighborhood, "Nook Farm" with his brother-in-law, John Hooker.

He was elected a Free Soiler to the United States Senate in 1854 to fill a vacancy and served until the end of the term in 1855, not being a candidate for reelection. Afterwards, Gillette became a lecturer on agriculture and temperance and was a trustee of the Connecticut State Normal School, also serving as its president for many years.

He aided in the formation of the Republican Party in Connecticut and for several years was a silent partner in the Evening Press, the organ of the party.

He engaged in the real estate business in Hartford, Connecticut until his death there on September 30, 1879. He was interred in Riverside Cemetery in Farmington, Connecticut.

The Francis Gillette House in Bloomfield, Connecticut, his home in early years of his antislavery involvement, is listed on the U.S. National Register of Historic Places.

Legacy 
Gillette Ridge Golf Club is named after Francis Gillette.

References

External links

1807 births
1879 deaths
People from Bloomfield, Connecticut
Republican Party members of the Connecticut House of Representatives
Yale College alumni
Politicians from Hartford, Connecticut
Connecticut Free Soilers
Free Soil Party United States senators
Republican Party United States senators from Connecticut
American temperance activists
People from Ashfield, Massachusetts